The Wilson Fuel Company Limited, often shortened to Wilson Fuel, is an independent petroleum wholesaler, distributor and retailer headquartered in Truro, Nova Scotia.  

In July 2021, Quebec based Couche-Tard announced a deal to purchase Wilson's retail gasoline/convenience store network and marine fuel terminal, for an undisclosed amount, pending approval by the Canadian Competition Bureau. Wilson Home Heating, Wilson Security, Kerr Controls and Ski Wentworth are not involved in the deal.

See also
 Petroeum Pricing in Nova Scotia
 Island Regulatory and Appeals Commission

References

External links

Report: Economics of the Nova Scotia Gasoline Market 

Companies based in Nova Scotia
Gas stations in Canada
Oil companies of Canada
Truro, Nova Scotia
Year of establishment missing